Clearfield Farm is a historic home located near Smyrna, New Castle County, Delaware.  It was built about 1755, and is a -story, four bay brick dwelling with a gable roof.  It is one room deep and has gable end chimneys and dormers.  It was the home of John Clark (1761–1821), 20th Governor of Delaware.  At one time it housed administrative offices for the Department of Corrections.

It was listed on the National Register of Historic Places in 1973.

References

Houses on the National Register of Historic Places in Delaware
Houses completed in 1755
Houses in New Castle County, Delaware
National Register of Historic Places in New Castle County, Delaware